Becky Wai-Ling Packard is Professor of Psychology and Education, and former Director of the Weissman Center for Leadership, Associate Dean of Faculty, and Founding Director of Teaching and Learning at Mount Holyoke College.

She received her B.A. from the University of Michigan and her Ph.D. from Michigan State University.  She is the winner of the Presidential Early Career Award for Scientists and Engineers (PECASE), the highest honor awarded to young scientists in the country.

References

External links 
New York Times Op Ed

21st-century American psychologists
American women psychologists
Mount Holyoke College faculty
University of Michigan alumni
Michigan State University alumni
1973 births
Living people
American women academics
21st-century American women